Ovillers-la-Boisselle is a commune in the Somme department in Hauts-de-France in northern France.

Geography

The constituent village of Ovillers-la-Boisselle (commonly shortened to "Ovillers") lies on the north of the D 929 road, north-east of Aveluy and south-west of Pozières.

The constituent village of La Boisselle, which had  in 1914, lies across the D 929, to the south-west of Ovillers at the junction of the D 104 to Contalmaison.

Population

History
The village of La Boisselle is a settlement dating back to pre-Roman times, and the D 929 Albert–Bapaume road follows the course of a Roman road. During the Franco-Prussian War (1870–1871), the area suffered serious damage after the Battle of Bapaume.

In World War I, the area was the site of intense and sustained fighting between German and Allied forces. Between 1914 and 1916, the Western Front ran through the commune, and its villages were completely destroyed. In 1916, the commune was the site of particularly heavy fighting during the Battle of the Somme (see Ovillers-la-Boisselle in World War I). After the Armistice of 11 November 1918, the former inhabitants returned and gradually rebuilt most of the infrastructure as it had been before the war.

In 2011, British researchers around Peter Barton started the  La Boisselle Project, a long-term archaeological, historical, technological and genealogical study with special focus on L'îlot de La Boisselle, a  historic site on the south-western tip of La Boisselle which was known during World War I as L'îlot to the French, Granathof to the Germans and Glory Hole to the British. The site still holds mine craters as well as traces of trenches, shelters and tunnels related to underground warfare, but is private property and not open to the public.

Places of interest
 Ovillers British Military Cemetery
 The Gordon Dump Cemetery
 Lochnagar Crater, one of the sites of the mines exploded on the first day of the Battle of the Somme.

See also
Communes of the Somme department
 Sausage Valley
 Capture of Ovillers
 Capture of La Boisselle
 L'îlot de La Boisselle

References

External links

 La Boisselle Study Group and La Boisselle Project 
 Ilot de La Boisselle 

 
World War I sites in France
Communes of Somme (department)